Charles O'Neil was a professional baseball catcher who played in the Negro leagues in the 1920s.

O'Neil made his professional debut in 1921 with the Columbus Buckeyes, and went on to play for the Bacharach Giants, Chicago American Giants, and Toledo Tigers through 1923.

References

External links
 and Baseball-Reference Black Baseball stats and Seamheads

Place of birth missing
Place of death missing
Year of birth missing
Year of death missing
Bacharach Giants players
Chicago American Giants players
Columbus Buckeyes (Negro leagues) players
Toledo Tigers players